The hairy frog (Trichobatrachus robustus) also known as the horror frog or Wolverine frog, is a Central African species of frog in the family Arthroleptidae. It is monotypic within the genus Trichobatrachus. Its common name refers to the somewhat hair-like structures on the body and thighs of the breeding male.

Description

The large head is broader than long, with a short rounded snout.
The former have a paired internal vocal sac and three short ridges of small black spines along the inner surface of the first manual digit. Breeding males also develop hair-like dermal papillae that extend along the flanks and thighs. These contain arteries and are thought to increase the surface area for the purpose of absorbing oxygen (comparably to external gills of the aquatic stage), which is useful as the male stays with his eggs for an extended period of time after they have been laid in the water by the female.

The species is terrestrial, but returns to the water for breeding, where egg masses are laid onto rocks in streams. The quite muscular tadpoles are carnivorous and feature several rows of horned teeth. Adults feed on slugs, myriapods, spiders, beetles, and grasshoppers.

The hairy frog is also notable in possessing retractable "claws", which it may project through the skin, apparently by intentionally breaking the bones of the toe.  These are not true claws, as they are made of bone, not keratin. In addition, there is a small bony nodule nestled in the tissue just beyond the frog's fingertip. When sheathed, each claw is anchored to the nodule with tough strands of collagen.  When the frog is grabbed or attacked, it breaks the nodule connection and forces the sharpened bones through the skin.  Although a retraction mechanism is not known, it has been hypothesized that the claws later retract passively, while the damaged tissue is regenerated. 

This type of natural weaponry appears to be unique in the animal kingdom, although the Otton frog possesses a similar "spike" in its thumb.  An alternative hypothesis is that the broken bones could provide a better grip on rocks.

Distribution
It is found in Cameroon, Democratic Republic of the Congo, Equatorial Guinea, Gabon, Nigeria, and possibly Angola.
Its natural habitats are subtropical or tropical moist lowland forests, rivers, arable land, plantations, and heavily degraded former forest.

Conservation status
T. robustus is threatened by habitat loss, but is not considered endangered.

Relation with humans
This species is roasted and eaten in Cameroon. They are hunted with long spears or machetes.
The Bakossi people traditionally believed that the frogs fall from the sky and, when eaten, it would help childless couples become fertile.

See also
 Gerald Durrell

References

Further reading
 AmphibiaWeb: Trichobatrachus robustus
 New Scientist news service: 'Horror frog' breaks own bones to produce claws Retrieved on June 9, 2008.
  (2008): Concealed weapons: erectile claws in African frogs. biology letters (published online).  – PDF

External links
 
 
 Hairy Frog – Trichobatrachus robustus, The BioFresh Cabinet of Freshwater Curiosities.

Arthroleptidae
Amphibians described in 1900
Taxa named by George Albert Boulenger
Frogs of Africa
Amphibians of Cameroon
Amphibians of the Democratic Republic of the Congo
Amphibians of Equatorial Guinea
Amphibians of Gabon
Amphibians of West Africa

Taxonomy articles created by Polbot